Finsevatnet is a lake in the municipality of Ulvik in Vestland county, Norway.  The  lake lies just south of the village of Finse where Finse Station on the Bergen Line is located.  The Finse Tunnel is located just north of the lake.  The southeast side of the lake has a dam which regulates the depth of the lake for the purposes of hydro-electric power generation.

See also
List of lakes in Norway

References

Ulvik
Lakes of Vestland
Reservoirs in Norway